Yevgeniy Mikhailovich Gavrilenko (born 5 April 1951) is a former Soviet athlete who competed mainly in the 400 metre hurdles. He trained at Dynamo in Gomel.

He competed for the USSR in the 1976 Summer Olympics held in Montreal, Canada in the 400 metre hurdles where he won the bronze medal.

References

Russian male hurdlers
Soviet male hurdlers
Dynamo sports society athletes
Olympic bronze medalists for the Soviet Union
Athletes (track and field) at the 1972 Summer Olympics
Athletes (track and field) at the 1976 Summer Olympics
Olympic athletes of the Soviet Union
1951 births
Living people
European Athletics Championships medalists
Medalists at the 1976 Summer Olympics
Olympic bronze medalists in athletics (track and field)